Gonzalo Peralta (17 September 1980 – 7 October 2016) was an Argentine footballer who at the time of his death played defender for Deportivo Riestra.

Club career

Before arriving at Almirante Brown, Peralta played two years at Club Comunicaciones in the Argentine lower divisions, appearing a total of 37 times and scoring four goals.

Peralta was a key member of the Almirante Brown defense since his arrival at the club during the 2004-05 season. In 2007 the central defender helped Almirante Brown obtain the championship of the Primera B Clausura tournament. More recently, Peralta served as team captain and in four years at the club appeared in 90 games, scoring 7 goals.

D.C. United opted not to pick up the option on Peralta's contract after the 2008 MLS season and was immediately loaned out to Argentinian side Unión de Santa Fe for the 2009 season.

Peralta died on 6 October 2016 at the age of 36.

Notes and references

External links
 Gonzalo Peralta at BDFA.com.ar 

1980 births
2016 deaths
Argentine expatriate footballers
Argentine footballers
D.C. United players
Major League Soccer players
Unión de Santa Fe footballers
Argentine expatriate sportspeople in the United States
Association football defenders
People from Vicente López Partido
Sportspeople from Buenos Aires Province